Ytterøya is an island in the Trondheimsfjord in the municipality of Levanger in Trøndelag county, Norway. The island has good agricultural land and has settlements across the whole island. The Levanger–Hokstad Ferry connects the village of Hokstad on the island to the town of Levanger on the mainland. Ytterøy Church is located on the island.

The old municipality of Ytterøy encompassed this island and some of the lands around it.  Ytterøya has many burial mounds from the Stone Age.  The island is famous for its dense roe deer population, and a popular hunting area for hunters from Scandinavia and Germany. In the middle of the 19th century phosphorus was exported to all of Europe from the mines here.

References

Levanger
Islands of Trøndelag